Digimon Data Squad, known in Japan as , is the fifth anime television series in the Digimon franchise, produced by Toei Animation. The series aired in Japan on Fuji TV from April 2, 2006 to March 25, 2007. A standalone film based on the series was released on December 9, 2006.

An English-language version was produced by Studiopolis, in conjunction with Toei Animation USA and Disney Enterprises, Inc., and aired in North America on Toon Disney's Jetix block from October 1, 2007 to November 1, 2008.

Plot
The Digital Accident Tactics Squad (DATS) is a government organization established to maintain the peace between the Real World and the Digital World, transporting any Digimon back to the Digital World. Marcus, a junior high school student, becomes one of the members for the organization. He learns that the Digimon Merukimon is opposing mankind. However, the past is revealed that the scientist Akihiro Kurata was responsible for invading the Digital World. He gained the support of the government to oppose all Digimon species, claiming they were a threat to mankind. When Kurata uses Belphemon, Marcus defeats them. Before dying, Kurata uses a bomb to make the Digital World merge with the human world. While the Digimon BanchoLeomon prevents the collision, Marcus meets King Drasil (Yggdrasil), the supreme ruler who attempts to protect the Digital World by destroying mankind, since they cannot exist in both dimensions. Marcus learns that his father, Spencer, was trapped in the Digital World for ten years, because Drasil possessed Spencer's body and BanchoLeomon kept the latter's soul. After Marcus defeats Drasil, Spencer's soul returns to his body. With both worlds restored, all Digimon partners return to their own world. Five years later, Marcus and his friends embrace their future.

Characters

Main characters

Marcus is a 14-year old, 8th grader junior high school student. He does not wear any goggles unlike any main leader characters in any other Japanese Digimon anime. As a delinquent, he challenges himself to become the strongest street fighter. He is partnered with Agumon. Marcus also appeared in the third and final season of Digimon Fusion.

Partner of Marcus Damon. Has a very big appetite.

Thomas is a 14-year-old teen genius of Japanese and Austrian descent. He comes from a privileged background and his tendency to rely on carefully planned strategies causes him to clash with Marcus at times. He is partnered with Gaomon.

Partner of Thomas H. Norstein

Yoshi is an 18-year-old field agent at DATS. She is partnered with Lalamon.

Partner of Yoshi Fujieda

Keenan is a young boy who goes missing in the Digital World when a lab experiment had gone awry. He grew up with prejudice against humans. He is partnered with Falcomon.

Partner of Keenan Crier.

Recurring characters

Partner of Richard Sampson, later revealed to be Kentaurosmon of the Royal Knights.

He is partnered with Kamemon.

Mother of Marcus and Kristy Damon.

Younger sister of Marcus Damon. She is partnered with Biymon.

Antagonists

A mega-level Shaman Digimon who raised Keenan and met Spencer Damon a decade before the events of the series, believing there can be co-existence until Kurata's actions convinced Merukimon that humans are attacking the Digimon. But learning the truth from Kurata himself, Merukimon decided to try believing in Spencer's words again and sacrificed his life to save Keenan, Marcus, and the others from Kurata's Gizumon. 

A rookie-level Rock Digimon.

A mega-level Beast Digimon who hates all humans because of their actions against Digimon. He comes to the real world to fight the Data Squad, only to be stunned by Gizumon’s laser, and was destroyed by RizeGreymon.

The evil, hateful, and fierce mad scientist who is the antagonist of the first half of the series, Kurata was originally Spencer Damon's assistant during their exploration of the Digital World who believed Digimon are a threat to humans as he seeks to completely destroy most of them with his artificial Gizumon while subjugating the rest for world dominion. When the Tactics Squad learned his true plans, he turns the Confidentiality Ministry on them while awakening Belphemon. Later, he takes control of Belphemon himself. After Belphemon's defeat, he ends up becoming a victim of his space-oscillation bomb.

A slothful, catastrophic, and aggressive Demon Lord Digimon who is sealed for years before Kurata freed him and later awakened.

King Drasil is a host computer being in the form of a tree, serving as the main antagonist of the final half of the series when he took Kurata's actions as threat to the Digital World and sends the Royal Knights to attack humanity in retaliation. Drasil initially used the body of Marcus's father Spencer Damon before transferring into his King Drasil 7D6 avatar body, ultimately deciding to destroy both worlds to start anew. But upon being defeated by Marcus and Agumon, Drasil accepts his defeat and enters a deep sleep after reviving Spencer.

Member of Royal Knights.

Production
The series was announced during the December 2005 Jump Festa convention in Japan with advertisements showing a remolded Agumon as the lead Digimon. The name of the series was later revealed in January 2006 with the character designs coming a month later. The characters were designed by Sayo Aoi. It is the final Digimon series to be produced in 4:3.

Media

Anime

The series aired 48 episodes on Fuji TV in Japan from April 2, 2006 to March 25, 2007. On April 25, 2007, Disney's ABC Network announced that it had signed an agreement with Toei Animation to license the show. Much of the staff that worked on Digimon: Digital Monsters, including director Jeff Nimoy, returned to work on Data Squad. The series finished airing in the US on Jetix on November 1, 2008, thirteen months after it premiered on October 1, 2007. Since March 15, the series began airing in the United Kingdom on Kix!

It was announced on February 12, 2009 that Toei Animation has signed Well Go USA with the DVD rights to Digimon Data Squad, and the first thirteen US edited English dub episodes has been made available on May 26, 2009. The release of the third DVD set was canceled. Madman Entertainment have released all episodes across four sets on Region 4 DVD in Australia and New Zealand with only the US English Edited TV dub by Studiopolis. Brazil had released several DVDs of the show. In 2014, Cinedigm Entertainment obtained the rights to the release of the season. A Complete Collection was released on March 11, 2014, in the US.

Theme songs
Opening themes
  by Dynamite SHU
Episodes: 1-29
  by Kōji Wada
Episodes 30-48
Ending themes
 "One Star" by Yousuke Itou
Episodes: 1-24
  by MiyuMiyu
Episodes: 25-47
Insert song
 "Believer" by Ikuo

Film

Video games
The series contained a number of related video games associated with the franchise.

 Digimon World DS: A game featuring several Digimon Savers characters, but does not focus on them. It can arguably be seen as a side-story to Digimon Savers. The game, released in America before the concept of Data Squad, uses the original Japanese names of the DATS team, who appear in certain quests.
 Digimon World Data Squad: A game focusing on the primary characters of the series, and which presents an original story that apparently runs parallel to the anime. It involves the members of DATS coming into conflict with the Seven Great Demon Lords.
 Digimon World: Dawn and Dusk: Sequel to Digimon World DS, a set of two games with slightly different stories. At the end of the game, the four main characters from Data Squad appear to battle the main character.
 Digimon Masters: A Digimon MMORPG where players take control of the primary characters of the DATS team. This game follows the storyline of the anime, however it is still incomplete and there are several story segments still currently missing.

References

External links

 Official Site (Japanese)
 Fuji TV site (Japanese)
 

2006 anime films
2007 Japanese television series endings
Adventure anime and manga
Anime spin-offs
Data Squad
Fuji TV original programming
Fiction about God
Television series about parallel universes
Toei Animation television